Michael Wolff may refer to:

 Michael Wolff (graphic designer) (born 1933), British graphic designer, co-founder of Wolff Olins
 Michael Wolff (journalist) (born 1953), American author, essayist, and journalist
 Michael Wolff (musician) (born 1952), American jazz musician
 Michael A. Wolff (born 1945), Chief Justice of the Supreme Court of Missouri, Dean Emeritus of Saint Louis University School of Law

See also 
 Michael Wolf (disambiguation)
 Michael Wolfe (disambiguation)